Taboiaki is a settlement in Kiribati.  It is located on the atoll of Nonouti; It is the largest village with 662 residents in the 2010 census (26% of the population of Nonouti). Matang is the administrative centre with 536 residents (20% of the island's population in 2010).

References

Populated places in Kiribati